Andorra competed at the 1988 Summer Olympics in Seoul, South Korea. Three competitors, all men, took part in three events in two sports.

Competitors
The following is the list of number of competitors in the Games.

Athletics

Key
 Note–Ranks given for track events are within the athlete's heat only
 Q = Qualified for the next round
 q = Qualified for the next round as a fastest loser or, in field events, by position without achieving the qualifying target
 NR = National record
 N/A = Round not applicable for the event
 Bye = Athlete not required to compete in round

Men
Track & road events

Cycling

Two cyclists represented Andorra in 1988.

Men

References

External links
Official Olympic Reports

Nations at the 1988 Summer Olympics
1988
1988 in Andorra